Normal for Norfolk (or NFN) is a slang term used in some parts of England for something that is peculiar, or odd.

The term comes from the inventive language created by doctors the world over to insult their patients.  Utilised by doctors and Social Services in Norfolk and elsewhere to depict patients of lesser intellect, some were moved to record the letters 'NFN' against the personal details of certain clients, where they were considered to be a bit strange or had peculiar habits.  According to the urban myth, such clients were so common in that area that they were considered normal as far as Norfolk was concerned.

The term is considered derogatory because it portrays people from Norfolk as normally being strange, or peculiar with an inference that they are in-bred. The portrayal of people from Norfolk in this light is a common stereotype in England.

Within Norfolk itself, the phrase may also be known as "Normal for Wisbech", which is in neighbouring Cambridgeshire.  In addition, most areas of the country have a regional variation of NFN, e.g. in North-West England, NFS (Normal for Stoke) may be heard.

References

Norfolk
medical slang